Apolinary Stanisław Kotowicz (24 March 1859, Biecz - 21 April 1917, Jasło) was a Polish painter of landscapes, portraits and genre scenes. He was also a set decorator and amateur photographer.

Biography 
His father, Antoni Kotowicz (1816-1885) was a doctor and naturalist from Lwów. He began his education in Tarnów. In 1878, he moved to Krakow, where he spent most of his adult life. Through 1887, he studied at the Academy of Fine arts with Jan Matejko (history painting) and Władysław Łuszczkiewicz (drawing and anatomy). After graduating, he spent two years in Munich on a scholarship, where he studied at a private school operated by Simon Hollósy, who took him on field trips to the Hungarian countryside.

Upon returning home, he began to exhibit regularly at the showings of the Kraków Society of Friends of Fine Arts. It was on display in Warsaw for three years (1896-1899), when the promoters went bankrupt and it was sold to Jan Styka, a panorama painter. It disappeared during World War I.

From 1898 to 1903, he was the decorator at the Kraków Municipal Theater. He also designed playbills and posters and illustrated the first edition of Tamten, a play by Gabriela Zapolska.

In 1904, he returned to his native countryside, settled in Jasło, and taught drawing at the local gymnasium, where he painted a "Vision of Saint Francis" for the school chapel. Together with Włodzimierz Tetmajer (an associate from the Panorama Tatr) he created decorations for the parish church in Biecz. He was also involved in the cataloguing and preservation of local monuments. Following the Gorlice–Tarnów Offensive, he painted scenes of the destruction in the vicinity of Jasło. He died during the German Occupation.

References

Further reading 
 W. Gajewska, "Apolinary Stanisław Kotowicz. Artysta malarz 1859 – 1917" in Rocznik Jasielski vol.III, 1990.

External links

 Biographical notes and images from the Galeria Osobowości @ Facebook

1859 births
1917 deaths
Polish painters
Polish male painters
Polish landscape painters
Jan Matejko Academy of Fine Arts alumni
Set decorators
Polish poster artists
People from Gorlice County